Miloslav Radenović is a Serbian former football coach.

Syria
At the helm of the Syria Under-20s for three years before, Radenovic was reinstated as coach of the team ahead of the 2005 FIFA World Youth Championship. The last time the Serbian coach worked with the Syrian Football Association before that was 2003. While managing the Syria national football team in 2005, Radenovic was involved in a situation where his team and the Oman national team they were countering showed up at different venues for the match.

He has mentored the Syria U16s as well.

References

External links
 

Year of birth missing (living people)
Living people
Syria national football team managers
Serbian football managers
Serbian expatriate football managers
Expatriate sportspeople in Syria